Rehmannia is a genus of seven species of flowering plants in the order Lamiales and family Orobanchaceae, endemic to China. It has been placed as the only member of the monotypic tribe Rehmannieae, but molecular phylogenetic studies suggest that it forms a clade with Triaenophora. Contrary to the immense majority of the taxa of Orobanchaceae, Rehmannia is not parasitic.

Systematics

Etymology
Rehmannia is named for Joseph Rehmann (1788–1831), a physician in St. Petersburg.

Homonymy
The name "Rehmannia" has also been given to a genus of Jurassic ammonites of the family Reineckeidae.

Classification
The genus was included in the family Scrophulariaceae or Gesneriaceae in some older classifications. The current placement of the genus is in neither Scrophulariaceae s.s. nor Plantaginaceae s.l. (to which many other former Scrophulariaceae have been transferred). Earlier molecular studies suggested that its closest relatives were the genera Lancea and Mazus, which have been included in Phrymaceae. Subsequently, it was found that Rehmannia groups with Triaenophora, and both taxa are jointly the sister group to Lindenbergia and the parasitic Orobanchaceae. A 2016 classification of flowering plants, the APG IV system enlarged Orobanchaceae to include Rehmannia, making it one of the few genera in the family, along with Lindenbergia, not to be parasitic.

Species list
, Plants of the World Online accepted six species:
Rehmannia chingii H.L.Li
Rehmannia chrysantha M.H.Li & C.H.Zhang
Rehmannia glutinosa (Gaertn.) DC.
Rehmannia henryi N.E.Br.
Rehmannia japonica (Thunb.) Makino
Rehmannia piasezkii Maxim.
Rehmannia solanifolia P.C.Tsoong & T.L.Chin

Uses
Sometimes known as Chinese foxglove due to its superficial resemblance to the genus Digitalis, the species of Rehmannia are perennial herbs. The plants have large flowers and are grown as ornamental garden plants in Europe and North America, and are used medicinally in Asia.

Traditional Chinese medicine
Known as dìhuáng (地黄) or gān dìhuáng (干地黄) in Chinese, R. glutinosa is used as a medicinal herb for many conditions within Chinese traditional formulations.

It is the main ingredient in a mixture called si wu tang (four substance decoction) along with Dang gui, Chinese peony (bai shao yao), and Ligusticum striatum (chuan xiong) that is considered a fundamental medicine to support making blood.

When two ingredients, peach (tao ren) and safflower (hong hua), are added, it is called tao hong si wu tang (four substance decoction with peach pit and safflower), which is used in TCM for fatigue.

Chemical constituents
Rehmannia contains the vitamins A, B, C, and D, as well as other compounds, such as catalpol, an iridoid glycoside.

References

External links

 
Medicinal plants of Asia
Dietary supplements
Plants used in traditional Chinese medicine
Orobanchaceae genera